The women's 100 metres event at the 2006 African Championships in Athletics was held at the Stade Germain Comarmond on August 9–10.

Medalists

Results

Heats
Wind: Heat 1: -3.6 m/s, Heat 2: -2.9 m/s, Heat 3: -3.4 m/s

Final
Wind: -3.8 m/s

References
Results 

2006 African Championships in Athletics
100 metres at the African Championships in Athletics
2006 in women's athletics